D'Ambrosi is a surname of Italian origin. Notable people with the surname include:

 Dante D'Ambrosi (1902–1965), Italian composer
 Dario D'Ambrosi (born 1958), Italian actor and filmmaker
 Jasper D'Ambrosi (died 1986), Italo-American painter

See also
 D'Ambrosio

Surnames of Italian origin